321 Studios was a privately held company headquartered in St. Louis, Missouri with a sales office in Berkeley, California.  The company was a leading provider of DVD authoring software, including the highly controversial DVD X Copy product line of DVD copy software. The DVDXCopy family of products enabled novice computer users to quickly and easily copy any DVD movie, including DVD movies protected with the Content Scrambling System (CSS).  321 Studios' products were sold through most major North American and International retailers and worldwide through the company's website.

In February 2004, after a three-year legal battle with several of the major Hollywood studios, the DVDXCopy products were deemed by a California court to be in violation of the Digital Millennium Copyright Act (DMCA) in the case 321 Studios v. Metro Goldwyn Mayer Studios, Inc. and were banned from selling DVD Content Scrambling System circumvention software. The company was shut down in August 2004.

Citations

External links
 PC Mag article on DVD X Copy
 AfterDawn article about 321 Studios' shutdown

DVD companies of the United States
DVD rippers
Privately held companies based in Missouri
Companies disestablished in 2004